Helbronner may refer to:

People with the surname
Jacques Helbronner (1873-1943), French Jewish official.
Paul Helbronner (1871–1938), French alpinist.

Locations
Pointe Helbronner, a mountain the Alps.

See also
Heilbronner